CCGS Vakta is a vessel of the Canadian Coast Guard. She was built in Wheatley, Ontario and was named Vakta, which comes from Icelandic meaning to "watch, guard, or patrol". Vakta is the only Canadian Coast Guard vessel on Lake Winnipeg and stationed in Gimli, Manitoba, the largest harbour between Sarnia, Ontario and Vancouver, British Columbia.

Description
The vessel is equipped with one rigid-hulled inflatable boat launched from the stern. The ship has a complement of four Coast Guard personnel.

Service history
Vatka was constructed by Hike Metal Products Ltd. of Wheatley, Ontario and launched in 2003. The vessel was completed and accepted into service as Vatka whose meaning is of Icelandic origin meaning "watch, guard or patrol". The vessel is home ported at the Canadian Coast Guard base in Gimli, Manitoba on Lake Winnipeg. The Coast Guard unit in Gimli is tasked with placing navigational markers on Lake Winnipeg and leading search and rescue missions on the lake.

References

External links

2003 ships
Ships built in Ontario
Ships of the Canadian Coast Guard